George William Bagby (August 13, 1828 – November 29, 1883) was an American physician and humorist.

Early life and education
He was born in Buckingham County, Virginia, to George Bagby and Virginia Evans. He attended Delaware College and the University of Pennsylvania, where he studied medicine.

Career
After finishing his studies, Bagby became engaged in editorial work, especially on the Southern Literary Messenger from 1859 to near the end of the American Civil War. Subsequently, he was made the state librarian and became widely known as a lecturer and humorist, writing under the name "Mozis Addums."

He kept alive the old school of Southern humor, founded by Augustus Baldwin Longstreet and Johnson J. Hooper. An example of that humor, which contained local dialect, phonetic spelling and an eccentric character, is Rubenstein's Piano-Playin. It is a short narrative of a surly, less-than-sophisticated soul, who describes how he was deeply moved by a piano concert. His works were collected in three volumes (Richmond, 1884–86).

Bagby is less known for his work as a journalist. As the Richmond correspondent of the Charleston Mercury during the Civil War, Bagby covered the politics of the war and made a reputation for Hermes, his pen name, as a fearless writer who would criticize Confederate General Robert E. Lee as easily as Confederate President Jefferson Davis.

Legacy
Bagby's most popular essay was "The Old Virginia Gentleman" (1877), a paean to antebellum plantation life in Virginia.

References 

Wilson, James Southall. "Bagby, George William." Dictionary of American Biography.  Vol. 1, Charles Scribner's Sons. 1928.  
 Trent, Southern Writers (1905)  
 American National Biography, vol. 1, pp. 868–869.
Andrews, J. Cutler. The South Reports the Civil War. Princeton, N.J.: Princeton University Press, 1970.
Bagby, George William, and Thomas Nelson Page. The Old Virginia Gentleman, And Other Sketches. New York: C. Scribner's Sons, 1910.googlebooks Retrieved May 10, 2008 
The South Reports the Civil War by J. Cutler Andrews (Princeton University Press, 1970, and the Charleston Mercury, 1861 to 1865.

External links

 Canal Reminiscences: Recollections of Travel in the Old Days on the James River & Kanawha Canal. Richmond: West, Johnston & Co., 1879.
 Rubenstein's Piano-Playing – read an example of the old school of Southern humor.
 George William Bagby in Encyclopedia Virginia
 
 

American librarians
American humorists
1828 births
1883 deaths
American male non-fiction writers
19th-century American journalists
19th-century American male writers
University of Delaware alumni
Perelman School of Medicine at the University of Pennsylvania alumni
People from Buckingham County, Virginia
Journalists from Virginia